Future Football Club, formerly known as Coca-Cola FC, is an Egyptian professional football club based in Cairo, Egypt. The club currently plays in the Egyptian Premier League, the highest league in the Egyptian football league system.

History
The club was owned by the Egyptian branch of The Coca-Cola Company since its establishment in 2011 until 2021. Coca-Cola's last season under that name witnessed their promotion to the 2021–22 Egyptian Premier League for the first time in their history, as they finished top of their group in the 2020–21 Egyptian Second Division.

On 2 September 2021, Future company for sports investments announced the acquisition of the club for a reported fee of £E80 million (approximately €4 million), and renamed the club to Future FC. In their first season Future finished 5th in the league but still qualified to the CAF confederation cup due to the EFA submitting the list of teams qualifying to the CAF champions league and confederation cup early as per CAF requirements. Future FC also managed to win the Egyptian league cup in their first season

Current squad

 (captain)

Performance in CAF competitions
FR = First round
SR = Second round

Honours

 EFA League Cup: 2022

References 

 
Egyptian Second Division
Football clubs in Cairo
Association football clubs established in 2011
2011 establishments in Egypt